Big Boys is a British television sitcom created and written by Jack Rooke, first broadcast on Channel 4 and available on All 4 from 26 May 2022. It stars Dylan Llewellyn and Jon Pointing as first-year university students who live together, set in 2013, told from the point of view of Llewellyn's character Jack—a semi-fictionalised version of Rooke, who narrates the series—as he recovers from his father's death and explores his sexuality for the first time.

The show was renewed for a second series in August 2022, set for a 2023 broadcast.

Cast and characters

Main 
 Dylan Llewellyn as Jack, a closeted, shy 19-year-old student on a journalism scholarship, who is grieving over his father's death and unused to the heavy social life of university, having cooped up at home for the past few years with his mother
 Jon Pointing as Danny, a 25-year-old mature student, who is keen on nights out and trying to chat up other female students, while dealing with mental health issues for which he takes antidepressants
 Katy Wix as Jules, a former Brent Uni student-turned-student union officer, possessing an overenthusiastic and zealous approach to integrating new students
 Camille Coduri as Peggy, Jack's mother, who hides her struggles over sending her son away to university, having had him to rely on for the past couple of years. Jack has hidden his sexuality from her, expecting a bad reaction.
 Izuka Hoyle as Corinne, a studious and serious Oxbridge reject, who is also eager to let her hair down
 Olisa Odele as Yemi, a gay fashion student who accompanies Jack as he tries to explore his sexuality at university

Recurring 
 Kristy Philipps as Leisa, a feminist student initially hesitant to Danny's charms, but get together down the line
 Callum Mardy as Ash, a student union representative who deals drugs to new students on the side
 Rhiannon Clements as 'Mad Debs', a first-year student from Newcastle upon Tyne who drops out in the first week
 Harriet Webb as Shannon, Jack's effervescent cousin, whose job running children's parties is not fulfilling her aspirations as she would like
 Annette Badland as Nanny Bingo, Jack's grandmother
 Ian Burfield as Laurie, Jack's father, who passed away from cancer two years before Jack started university
 Sheila Reid as Iris, Danny's grandmother, whose Alzheimer's is slowly worsening.
 Robert Gilbert as Tim, a young journalism lecturer who readily deals in caustic language when approaching student queries.
 Lucia Keskin as Kelly, a student union representative who apathetically assists Jules
 Mark Silcox as Dhru 'Ru' Pal, a security officer at the university halls

Episodes 
All episodes were made available on All 4 prior to broadcast on 26 May 2022.

Production 
The show's commissioning was announced in November 2020, following a pilot that was shot around 2018.

The series is based on Rooke's comedy stage shows Good Grief, Happy Hour, and Love Letters. Rooke said that the series is semi-autobiographical; when asked "how truthful to his life" the show is, Rooke commented it was "[a]bout fifty-fifty".

Reception

Viewership 
Over the six episodes, the series averaged 410,000 viewers including catch-up within seven days post-broadcast. Including viewership prior to broadcast - through the series being made available in full on-demand on All4 following the broadcast of the first episode - and all viewership on devices aside from televisions (smartphones, laptops and tablets), the series averaged 669,000 viewers.

Critical reception 
Big Boys has been critically praised. Carol Midgley in a four-star review for The Times, wrote that it is "one of the most funny, tender, profound sad-happy comedies I've seen this year and is worth anyone's time, not just because it tackles the themes of grief, coming of age and sexuality with a beautifully light touch, but because the cast give the impression that they love performing it." 

Lucy Mangan writes in her four-star review for The Guardian; "[i]t is warm and funny, but with a melancholic undertow that fades in and out as the episode – and the series – goes on, but never disappears entirely", and that "[a]lthough it is gentler and less frenetic, Big Boys combination of frankness, heart and wit – and the seriousness with which it treats young people and the problems they face – evokes the mighty Sex Education", but simultaneously, "Rooke makes it entirely its own thing – and one that can pierce your heart when you least expect it". She touches upon the relationship between Jack and Danny in the series, saying [t]he growing friendship between the two young men, in a genre and world when such things are seldom showcased or made part of the cultural narrative, is genuinely uplifting", and also praises Katy Wix's "tremendous turn". 

In a further four-star review for The Telegraph, Anita Singh poses that "this bubbly sitcom ... is also a sensitively handled study of friendship and loss", and "[t]he heartfelt bits are skilfully woven around more standard comedy", with "plenty of laughs, but at its heart this is the story of a friendship that you dearly hope will work out". In comments also for The Telegraph, Victoria Coren Mitchell wrote that "[d]epicted well enough, as they are here, surely any viewer can relate to those feelings of social awkwardness, wrongness, outsiderism and embarrassment which characterise teenage existence and – for many of us – the rest of our lives as well" - recalling how she felt at university - and that the show "triggers tears in the eyes from both comedy and poignancy, which is very hard to do in a first series", comparing Jack Rooke's writing and lines to that Victoria Wood may have written, and "[w]e can't know how accurate a portrayal this is of Jack Rooke's actual life, but we can know he has a wonderful comic touch".

The show was included on The Guardian list of "the best TV of 2022 so far" in June 2022, which lauded Jack Rooke as "TV's most exciting voice of 2022", and the series as "a perfectly written and performed ode to gay-straight male friendship". Later in the year, it ranked sixth in The Guardians top 50 shows of 2022, with Hollie Richardson saying that when she finished watching the series: "I thought of all the men in my life I immediately wanted to implore to watch it. My initial hesitation about any awkwardness this might cause was proof that conversations around men's mental health still need to be normalised. But recommending this show to people is a gift – one I truly believe might change, maybe even save, some men's lives."

See also 
 Fresh Meat, an earlier Channel 4 comedy-drama set at university, broadcast and set during the early-mid 2010s

References

External links 
 
 
 Big Boys at All4

2020s British LGBT-related comedy television series
2020s British teen sitcoms
2020s college television series
2022 British television series debuts
2022 in LGBT history
British college television series
British LGBT-related sitcoms
Channel 4 sitcoms
English-language television shows
Gay-related television shows
Television series about teenagers
Television series set in the 2010s
Television series set in 2011 
Television series set in 2012 
Television series set in 2013
Television series set in 2014
Television shows about death